The Huisne is a  long river in France. It is a left tributary of the river Sarthe, which it meets in Le Mans. Its source is near the town of Pervenchères, in the Orne department.

The Huisne flows through the following departments and towns:

Orne: Saint-Jouin-de-Blavou, Rémalard, Condé-sur-Huisne, Le Theil
Eure-et-Loir: Nogent-le-Rotrou
Sarthe: La Ferté-Bernard, Montfort-le-Gesnois, Le Mans

References

Rivers of France
Rivers of Eure-et-Loir
Rivers of Orne
Rivers of Sarthe
Rivers of Centre-Val de Loire
Rivers of Normandy
Rivers of Pays de la Loire